Lasiancistrus guacharote is a species of armored catfish native to the Lake Maracaibo basin of Colombia and Venezuela.  This species grows to a length of  TL.

References
 

Ancistrini
Freshwater fish of Colombia
Fish of Venezuela
Fish described in 1840